Broome Stages is a 1966 British television series which originally aired on BBC 2 in eight episodes in 1966. It is based on the 1931 novel of the same title by Clemence Dane portraying the two hundred year history of a theatrical dynasty.

Main cast
 Gwen Watford as Lettice Broome
 Richard Pasco as Lord Lionel Wybird 
 Robin Phillips as Robin Broome
 Paul Daneman as Harry Broome 
 Emrys James as Morgan
 Betty Cooper as Lady Rosina
 Will Leighton as Throgmorton 
 Anthony Bate as William Broome
 Margaret Diamond as Mitcham
 Fionnula Flanagan as Maud
 George Little as Browntree
 Anna Barry as Donna Broome
 Stafford Byrne as Mr. Parkinson 
 Ian Colin as Russel Broome
 Michael Deacon as Stephen Broome
 John Gatrell as George, Duke of Bedenham
 Cavan Kendall as Russel Broome 
 Ralph Michael as Sir Joscelyn Pallas
 Andrew Robertson as Bill Seller 
 Terry Scully as Harlequin and Iago 
 Geoffrey Staines as  Dr. Burton
 Marda Vanne as  Mrs. Reilly

References

Bibliography
Baskin, Ellen . Serials on British Television, 1950-1994. Scolar Press, 1996.

External links
 

BBC television dramas
1966 British television series debuts
1966 British television series endings
1960s British drama television series
English-language television shows
Television shows based on British novels
Television series set in the 18th century
Television series set in the 19th century